The Kalasha Valleys are valleys in Chitral District in northern Pakistan. The valleys are surrounded by the Hindu Kush mountain range. The inhabitants of the valley are the Kalash people, who have a unique culture, language and follow a form of religion that is associated with their surroundings like the mountains and rivers. The largest and most populous valley is Bumburet (Mumuret), reached by a road from Ayun in the Kunar Valley. Rumbur is a side valley north of Bumburet.  The third valley, Biriu (Birir), is a side valley of the Kunar Valley south of Bumburet.

Kalash people

The Kalash people are a small religious and ethnic minority of Pakistan. The Kalash religion is polytheist faith similar to ancient forms of Hinduism and the people offer sacrifices for their gods. Their culture is interlinked with their religion and includes several unique festivals and celebrations. The people generally do not intermarry or cohabit regions with local Muslims but neither are they hostile towards them. The people are under legal and constitutional protection of the State of Pakistan as a scheduled tribe.

Gallery

See also
Ancient Greeks
Alexander the Great
 Kaghan Valley
 Neelam Valley
Naltar Valley
 Hunza Valley
 Chitral Kalash

References

Chitral Kalash 

 
Chitral District